The eighth season of the Fairy Tail anime series was directed by Shinji Ishihira and produced by A-1 Pictures and Bridge. The first ten episodes are an adaptation of the spin-off manga series Fairy Tail Zero by Hiro Mashima. Fairy Tail Zero is a prequel which focuses on the adventures of the guild's first master, Mavis Vermillion. The last two episodes adapt material from the last two chapters of the 49th volume of the original manga, and deal with Lucy Heartfilia reuniting with Natsu Dragneel and Happy at the Grand Magic Games. Season 8 is the second and final season of the 2014 anime series.

The 12-episode season ran from January 9, 2016, through March 26, 2016, on TV Tokyo in Japan. Funimation simulcasted the series with a broadcast dub in North America. Funimation released the season on Blu-ray/DVD on March 6, 2018 as "season 8".

Three pieces of theme music were used for this season: one opening and two ending themes. The ending themes are "Landscape", performed by Solidemo for the first 11 episodes; and "Masayume Chasing", performed by BoA, for the final episode of the season.

Episode list

Notes

References

General

Specific

External links
Official anime website

8
2016 Japanese television seasons